Leone Nawai (born 15 August 1995) is a Fijian rugby union player, currently playing for the . His preferred position is scrum-half.

Professional career
Nawai was named in the Fijian Drua squad for the 2022 Super Rugby Pacific season.

References

External links
itsrugby.co.uk Profile

1995 births
Living people
Fijian rugby union players
Rugby union scrum-halves
Fijian Drua players